Most of the schools in Macau are private or subsidized schools. As of the 2015-2016 school year, there were 74 primary and secondary schools that provided formal education, including ten public schools and 64 private schools. Of the schools all but ten were a part of Macau's free education network.  many of the schools in Macau are operated by Catholic organizations. A basic 15 years compulsory, free education, is offered to those pupils who have been enrolled at the schools which have met certain requirements stipulated by the government.

Moreover, the majority of the schools in Macau are grammar schools, which offer language learning, mathematics, science subjects, social studies, etc. to the pupils. There are only a few vocational schools in Macau, offering technical subjects such as car-repairing, electronics, constructions, etc.

As prescribed by the Basic Law of Macau Chapter VI Article 121, the Government of Macau shall, on its own, formulate policies on education, including policies regarding the educational system and its administration, the language of instruction, the allocation of funds, the examination system, the recognition of educational qualifications and the system of academic awards so as to promote educational development.  The government shall also in accordance with law, gradually institute a compulsory education system.  Community organizations and individuals may, in accordance with law, run educational undertakings of various kinds.

History

According to Sou-kuan Vong and Matilda Wong of the University of Macau, the prevalence of private schools in Macau is due to the Portuguese Macau government practice of not involving itself in educational matters.

By the early 1950s pro-Communist and pro-Nationalist forces competed over how much influence they had in Macau's education system. Christian schools in Macau gained strength at the expense of secular schools since the Christian schools received support from Christian organizations: the Roman Catholic Diocese of Macau assisted the Catholic schools and various churches based in and outside of Macau assisted the Protestant schools. There were ten schools affiliated with Nationalist forces in Macau during the early 1960s, and at the time the Nationalist forces had more influence than Communist ones. After 1967 and 1968 riots disrupted Nationalist forces, that faction's schools closed.

As of the 1990s secular private schools, including those supported by the pro-Mainland Macau Chinese Education System, other welfare organizations, and philanthropists; and the Christian schools had about equal amounts of influence and numbers of students.

System of education

At present, most schools in Macau follow a so-called "local education system" . That is, 6 years primary school education, 3 years for junior secondary school education and 3 years for senior secondary school education up to Form 6. In their senior secondary school years, students are usually required to steam in science, commerce, arts and music. 
Pupils who plan to study further would usually sit for the exam organised by the higher education institutes, or international assessment bodies like Edexcel, CIE and College Board, or the related government bodies in mainland China and Taiwan.

School Grade

Mediums of instruction

Regarding language learning in Macau, Cantonese and English are offered at most of the schools. Macau Portuguese School is currently the only school in Macao offering curricula similar to those of Portugal and a Portuguese-language education for pupils from 1st grade to 12th grade.

Primary, secondary, and vocational education

In the 2007-2008 school year, Macau had 55 private preschool, primary and secondary schools with subsidised tuition, 15 private preschool, primary and secondary schools without subsidised tuition, and 13 government preschool, primary and secondary schools, with a total of 83 primary and secondary schools. These schools altogether had 80,223 students and 4,610 teachers.

 Macau parents generally choose schools by their reputations since Macau does not have territory-wide standard examinations, and there is a preference for religious schools among upper-class parents due to the perceived higher quality of education.  the 27 Catholic schools in Macau made up about 36.4% of the educational sectors other than tertiary education.

Since 2007, in accordance with the general education goal of "Love China, love Macau ", China People Education Press in China, which is the official press affiliated to the Ministry of Education of China, has cooperated with the Macao Education and Youth Bureau to compile and publish three textbooks for Macao primary and secondary schools, including the "History" and "Character and Citizenship" and " Geography ".

Higher education

There are more than ten higher-learning institutions in Macau. Some students choose to further their studies in the local universities or polytechnics whereas some others choose to further their studies in mainland Portugal, mainland China, Taiwan, Hong Kong, the UK, the US, Canada, Australia, or some other places.

See also
 Education in the People's Republic of China
 Education by country

References

Further reading
Bray, M. et al. (2001). Higher Education in Macau: Strategic Development for the New Era. Consultation document prepared for the Macau SAR government. January.
Fan, Andy (University of Macau). "The readiness of schools of Macao to integrate IT in education and the extent of actual IT integration." International Journal of Education and Development using Information and Communication Technology (IJEDICT), 2010, Vol. 6, Issue 4, pp. 52–63.
Morrison, K. R. B. (2007). Structural Inequality in Macau's Workplaces and Schools. Macau Business, September, 60.
Tang, H.H. (2010). "Higher Education Governance and Academic Entrepreneurialism in East Asia: The Two Episodes of Hong Kong and Macau". Research Studies in Education 8: 106-124..
Tang, Kwok-Chun (Hong Kong Baptist University) and Mark Bray (University of Hong Kong). "Colonial models and the evolution of education systems: centralization and decentralization in Hong Kong and Macau." World Bank.